Probalaenifrons is a genus of moths of the family Crambidae. It contains only one species, Probalaenifrons argillacea, which is found in Indonesia.

References

Natural History Museum Lepidoptera genus database

Odontiinae
Taxa named by Eugene G. Munroe
Crambidae genera
Monotypic moth genera